"Toothbrush" is a song by American band DNCE. It impacted American contemporary hit radio as the second and final single from their debut EP Swaay (2015), on October 30, 2015. It was later added to their self-titled debut studio album. The song was written by DNCE lead singer Joe Jonas alongside Ilya Salmanzadeh, James Ghaleb, and Rickard Göransson and was produced by Ilya.

Music video
An accompanying music video for "Toothbrush" was directed by Luke Monaghan and premiered May 17, 2016. Featuring model Ashley Graham as Jonas' love interest, the video has received praise for presenting a body-positive image.

Personnel
 Mixer: Serban Ghenea
 Assistant Mixer: John Hanes
 Engineer: Sam Holland
 Assistant Recording Engineer: Cory Bice
 Assistant Recording Engineer: Jeremy Lertola
 Programming, Producer, Keyboards, Percussion, Lyricist, Composer: Ilya Salmanzadeh
 Drums: Peter Carlsson
 Percussion, Lyricist, Composer, Background Vocalist, Guitar: James Alan Ghaleb
 Bass, Percussion, Lyricist, Composer, Guitar: Rickard Göransson
 Lyricist, Composer: Joe Jonas

Charts

Certifications

Release history

References

2015 songs
2015 singles
Body image in popular culture
DNCE songs
Republic Records singles
Song recordings produced by Ilya Salmanzadeh
Songs written by Ilya Salmanzadeh
Songs written by Joe Jonas
Songs written by Rickard Göransson